Charaktery (Personalities) is a monthly magazine published in Poland and covering psychology-related topics, such as relationships, mental health, the functioning of the brain, neuropsychology, emotions, overcoming addictions, depression, and alcoholism. It is written for an audience of non-psychologists. The magazine was established in 1997.

Recognition
In September 2008 the Polish weekly newspaper Media i Marketing Polska chose the magazine as its "Magazine of the Year".

Criticism

In 2007 Tomasz Witkowski submitted a hoax paper in the style of the Sokal affair.

References

External links
 

1997 establishments in Poland
Magazines established in 1997
Magazines published in Poland
Monthly magazines published in Poland
Polish-language magazines
Popular psychology magazines